The Coupe du Congo is the top knockout tournament of the Congolese (DR Congo) football. It was created in 1961.

Winners

1961: FC Saint Eloi Lupopo (Lubumbashi) 5–1 AS Vita Club (Kinshasa)
1962–63: Not Played
1964: CS Imana (Kinshasa) 3–1 FC Saint-Éloi Lupopo (Lubumbashi)
1965: AS Dragons (Kinshasa)
1966: TP Mazembe (Lubumbashi)
1967: TP Mazembe (Lubumbashi)
1968: FC Saint Eloi Lupopo (Lubumbashi)
1971: AS Vita Club (Kinshasa)
1972: AS Vita Club (Kinshasa)
1973: AS Vita Club (Kinshasa)
1974: CS Imana (Kinshasa)
1975:: AS Vita Club (Kinshasa)
1976: TP Mazembe (Lubumbashi)
1977: AS Vita Club (Kinshasa)
1978: CS Imana (Kinshasa)
1979: TP Mazembe (Lubumbashi)
1980: Lubumbashi Sport
1981: AS Vita Club (Kinshasa)
1982: AS Vita Club (Kinshasa)
1983: AS Vita Club (Kinshasa)
1984: CS Imana (Kinshasa) 1–2 1–0 AS Vita Club (Kinshasa)
1985: DC Motema Pembe (Kinshasa)
1986: AS Kalamu (Kinshasa)
1987: AS Kalamu (Kinshasa)
1988: AS Kalamu (Kinshasa)
1989: AS Kalamu (Kinshasa)
1990: DC Motema Pembe (Kinshasa)
1991: DC Motema Pembe (Kinshasa)
1992: US Bilombe
1993: DC Motema Pembe (Kinshasa)
1994: DC Motema Pembe (Kinshasa) 2–0 AS Bantous (Mbuji-Mayi)
1995: AC Sodigraf (Kinshasa) 4–0 OC Mbongo Sport (Mbuji-Mayi)
1996: AS Dragons (Kinshasa)
1997: AS Dragons (Kinshasa) 2–1 AS Vita Club (Kinshasa)
1998: AS Dragons (Kinshasa) 1–0 AS Sucrière (Kwilu Ngongo)
1999: AS Dragons (Kinshasa) 3–2 (a.p.) AS Paulino (Kinshasa)
2000: TP Mazembe (Lubumbashi) 2–0 AS Saint-Luc (Kananga)
2001: AS Vita Club (Kinshasa) 3–0 AS Veti Club (Matadi)
2002: US Kenya (Lubumbashi) 2–1 SM Sanga Balende (Mbuji-Mayi)
2003: DC Motema Pembe (Kinshasa) 2–0 TP Mazembe (Lubumbashi)
2004: SC Cilu (Lukala) 1–0 AS Saint-Luc (Kananga)
2005: AS Vita Kabasha 1–1 (4–2 pen) SC Cilu (Lukala)
2006: DC Motema Pembe (Kinshasa) 4–1 AS Dragons (Kinshasa)
2007: AS Maniema Union (Kindu) 2–1 FC Saint-Éloi Lupopo (Lubumbashi)
2008: OC Bukavu Dawa (Bukavu) 2–0 DC Virunga (Goma)
2009: DC Motema Pembe (Kinshasa) 0–0 (5–4 pen) AS Dragons (Kinshasa)
2010: DC Motema Pembe (Kinshasa) 3–0 AS Ndoki a Ndombe (Boma)
2011: US Tshinkunku (Kananga) 1–1 (4–3 pen) AS Veti Club (Matadi)
2012: CS Don Bosco (Lubumbashi) 4–0 AS Veti Club (Matadi)
2013: FC MK Etanchéité (Kinshasa) 1–0 AS Vutuka (Kikwit)
2014: FC MK Etanchéité (Kinshasa) 1–0 FC Saint-Éloi Lupopo (Lubumbashi)
2015: FC Saint-Éloi Lupopo (Lubumbashi) 1–0 Katumbi FA (Lubumbashi)
2016: FC Renaissance (Kinshasa) 2-0 CS Don Bosco (Lubumbashi)
2017: AS Maniema Union (Kindu) 1–1 (4–1 pen) FC Saint-Éloi Lupopo (Lubumbashi)
2018: AS Nyuki (Butembo) 2–1 JS Kinshasa (Kinshasa)
2019: AS Maniema Union (Kindu) 1–1 (5–4 pen) FC Renaissance (Kinshasa)
2020: Abandoned
2021: DC Motema Pembe (Kinshasa) 1–0 SM Sanga Balende (Mbuji-Mayi)
2022: DC Motema Pembe (Kinshasa) 1–0 Academic Club Rangers (Kinshasa)

Total

References

External links
Coupe du Congo - LeopardsFoot

Football competitions in the Democratic Republic of the Congo
Democratic
Football in the Democratic Republic of the Congo